The United States national rugby sevens team began the 2016-17 World Rugby Sevens Series slowly, sitting in 11th place after the first three rounds. The U.S. was missing certain key players from the previous season. The U.S. turned things around mid-season. In the second half of the season, the team for the first time reached four consecutive semifinals: first at the USA Sevens where the U.S. finished third; then at the Canada Sevens where Perry Baker scored 9 tries including his 100th career try; followed by Hong Kong and Singapore. The U.S. finished the season in fifth place overall, a record high for the team.

Perry Baker and Danny Barrett were both selected to the 2016-17 Dream Team.

Tournament results

Player statistics 
Perry Baker was the season's leading try scorer (57) and points scorer (285) on the Series. Madison Hughes ranked third in points (279). 

The following table shows the players who appeared in at least 12 matches for the U.S. during the 2016–17 Sevens Series season.

References

2016–17 World Rugby Sevens Series
2015
Sevens
Sevens